Sannae-myeon is a myeon or a township in the subdivision of Gyeongju City, North Gyeongsang province, South Korea. Its 142.64 square kilometers are home to about 3,624 people. This population is served by one elementary school, two branch schools and a kindergarten affiliated with the elementary school, and one joint middle-high school.

Administrative divisions
Sannae-myeon is further divided into the following ri (administrative divisions):

Daehyeon 1-ri (대현1리)
Daehyeon 2-ri (대현2리)
Daehyeon 3-ri (대현3리)
Gamsan 1-ri (감산1리)
Gamsan 2-ri (감산2리)
Ilbu 1-ri (일부1리)
Ilbu 2-ri (일부2리)
Naechil 1-ri (내칠1리)
Naechil 2-ri (내칠2리)
Nae-il 1-ri (내일1리)
Nae-il 2-ri (내일2리)
Oechil 1-ri (외칠1리)
Oechil 2-ri (외칠2리)
Sin-won 1-ri (신원1리)
Sin-won 2-ri (신원2리)
Uigok 1-ri (의곡1리)
Uigok 2-ri (의곡2리)
Ura 1-ri (우라1리)
Ura 2-ri (우라2리)

See also
Subdivisions of Gyeongju
Administrative divisions of South Korea

References

External links
The official site of the Sannae-myeon office 

Subdivisions of Gyeongju
Towns and townships in North Gyeongsang Province